Rudy Philippe Michel Camille Gestede (born 10 October 1988) is a professional footballer who last played as a striker for Iranian club Esteghlal. 

After coming through the youth ranks at Metz, Gestede spent a year on loan gaining experience with Cannes, scoring four goals in 22 appearances, before returning to Metz in 2010. In the summer of 2011, he joined Cardiff City, helping the club to secure promotion to the Premier League. However, he found first team chances limited with Cardiff at the start of 2013–14, prompting a loan move to Blackburn Rovers in 2013. In January 2014, he made a permanent transfer to Blackburn and established himself in the first team, forming a prolific partnership with Jordan Rhodes in attack.

Gestede played internationally for France at under-19 level before switching international allegiance to Benin, going on to win 11 caps for the national side since his debut in 2013.

Club career

Metz
Born in Essey-lès-Nancy, Gestede started at youth level at the age of 16, in 2004, where he played for Metz. A year later, he signed a professional contract with Metz's B Team. In 2007, he was promoted to play for the first team, whilst still also continuing to play for the B team, but in 2010, he ended his five years playing for the B team when he was sent on loan to Cannes.

Cardiff City
Gestede joined Football League Championship side Cardiff City on a week-long trial during City's training camp in Seville, Spain in July 2011. He scored his first goal for Cardiff in the 25th minute of the club’s pre-season friendly against Charlton Athletic on 15 July. On 23 July, Gestede passed his medical and was unveiled as a Cardiff City player three days later. He made his competitive debut for Cardiff on 7 August against West Ham United, coming on in the 68th minute in place of Robert Earnshaw, setting up Kenny Miller for the match's only goal. Gestede's first start came the following game three days later, on 10 August, against Oxford United in the League Cup. He made his 50th appearance in a 5–3 victory over Huddersfield Town, putting in a man of the match performance. Gestede scored his first goal for Cardiff City against Leicester City in the League Cup, before going on to convert from the penalty spot in his side’s 7-6 penalty shootout victory over Leicester.

Gestede's first league goal came on 15 October against Ipswich Town, with the game also marking his first league start for Cardiff. The following game, however, on 21 October, he suffered an hamstring injury, which meant he was ruled out for several weeks. He returned in a goalless draw at Millwall on 10 December. Gestede found his third Cardiff goal in a 3–1 win over Peterborough United. He would come on and score a penalty in Cardiff City's semi-final victory against Crystal Palace in the League Cup. Gestede scored his third goal for Cardiff on 14 February 2012, in a 3–1 win over Peterborough. In the League Cup Final against Premier League club Liverpool at Wembley Stadium on 26 February, City went down 3–2 on penalties, with Gestede missing one of the Bluebirds' spot-kicks. On 19 April, Gestede signed a two-year deal keeping him at Cardiff City Stadium until 2014.

Gestede suffered a pre-season injury which kept him out of the first two months of the 2012–13 season. He made his return on 6 October coming on in the second half against Ipswich Town, where he helped the Bluebirds to come back from a one-goal deficit. Gestede's first goal of the season came on 15 December in a 2–1 loss against Peterborough United. In what has been described as his finest performance yet in a Cardiff City shirt, Gestede scored two headers as City beat Nottingham Forest 3–0 at Cardiff City Stadium. He collected a winners' medal as City won the Championship title and were promoted to the Premier League in April 2013.

Blackburn Rovers

On 26 November 2013, Gestede joined Blackburn Rovers on loan until the end of 2013 under an emergency loan arrangement after he found his playing time at Cardiff reduced since their promotion to the Premier League. Blackburn manager Gary Bowyer stated that Gestede was the type of player the team needed to assist talisman Jordan Rhodes in an important season for the club.

Gestede scored his first goal for Rovers on 1 January 2014 against Leeds United via a header in a 2–1 victory.

On 1 January 2014, Gestede signed for the club permanently, on a three-and-a-half-year deal, along with Tom Cairney, who was also on loan at Blackburn at the same time as him. On 21 April, Gestede scored a first-half hat-trick, against Birmingham City. He won the Championship Player of the Month Award for April after scoring six goals in the seven games in that month.

Aston Villa
On 31 July 2015, after intense speculation, Gestede signed for Premier League club Aston Villa on a five-year deal for an undisclosed fee, believed to be £6 million. He made his debut as a substitute away at Bournemouth, heading the winning goal in a 1–0 victory. On 22 September 2015, he scored the winner in a 1–0 League Cup victory over archrivals Birmingham City. On 26 September 2015, he scored a brace in a 3–2 defeat to Liverpool away at Anfield.

Middlesbrough
On 2 January 2017, Aston Villa accepted a bid from Premier League club Middlesbrough for Gestede, reported to be in the region of £6m. He officially signed for the club on 4 January 2017. Gestede made his debut for the club and his top-level return in a 0–0 draw against Watford on 14 January 2017. He scored his first goal for the club in a 3–1 defeat against Manchester United on 19 March 2017. On 21 August 2017, Middlesbrough rejected a £6 million pound bid for the player from Leeds United.

He picked up an injury in September 2017, after picking up a dead leg which required surgery after a bleed. He returned from the injury on 2 December 2017 against Bristol City, he picked up another injury which almost ended his season when he fractured his ankle against Hull City in February 2018. He returned on 15 May 2018 for Middlesbrough as a second half substitute in the Championship Playoff Semi Final second leg against Aston Villa.

He was released after the club refused to extend his contract beyond 30 June 2020, along with teammate Daniel Ayala.

Melbourne Victory 
On 25 November 2020 Melbourne Victory announced that they had signed Gestede. He was quoted as saying “I am extremely pleased to have signed with Melbourne Victory for this season, after speaking with the club, in particular Grant Brebner, I was very impressed with the vision they outlined around the brand of football they want to play and the role they want me to play.” 

In his debut season with the Victory, Gestede made 18 appearances, finishing with 5 goals and 2 assists; alongside Jake Brimmer and Elvis Kamsoba, Gestede finished as Melbourne Victory's joint top goalscorer for the 2020-21 season.

Panetolikos 
After a poor season at Melbourne Victory, he signed a 2-year deal for Greek club Panetolikos, but he only played 3 games (all in the starting eleven) and scored just one goal.

Esteghlal 
On 30 October 2021, Gestede signed for Esteghlal on a two-year contract. He was given shirt number 39. Six days later, he made his debut for the club in a 1–1 draw against Fajr Sepasi. On 24 December, he scored his first goal for the club in a 3–0 victory against Shahr Khodro. On 17 March 2022, he scored 2 minutes after coming on as a substitute in a match against Persepolis, becoming Esteghlal's first non-Iranian player to score in the Tehran Derby. He left the club after his first season following his contract termination by mutual consent.

International career
Gestede played for the France under-19 national team between 2006 and 2008. He was called up for the Benin national team in February 2013 for the World Cup qualifiers due to a parent being of Beninois origin; he was also eligible for the United States through a grandparent.

After three years, he was recalled to the national team in August 2019.

Personal life
In the summer of 2012, Rudy's wife, Hawa, gave birth to their first child, Elijah Gestede. He is a Muslim.

Career statistics

Honours

Cardiff City
Football League Championship: 2012–13

Esteghlal
Iran Pro League: 2021–22

Individual
Football League Championship Player of the Month: April 2014

References

External links

1988 births
Living people
French Muslims
Citizens of Benin through descent
Beninese Muslims
Sportspeople from Meurthe-et-Moselle
French footballers
France youth international footballers
Beninese footballers
Benin international footballers
Association football forwards
FC Metz players
AS Cannes players
Cardiff City F.C. players
Blackburn Rovers F.C. players
Aston Villa F.C. players
Middlesbrough F.C. players
Melbourne Victory FC players
Esteghlal F.C. players
Ligue 1 players
Ligue 2 players
Championnat National players
English Football League players
Premier League players
French expatriate footballers
Beninese expatriate footballers
Expatriate footballers in Wales
Expatriate footballers in England
Expatriate footballers in Iran
French sportspeople of Beninese descent
French people of American descent
Footballers from Grand Est
French expatriate sportspeople in Wales
French expatriate sportspeople in England
Beninese expatriate sportspeople in Wales
French expatriate sportspeople in Australia
French expatriate sportspeople in Greece
French expatriate sportspeople in Iran
Beninese expatriate sportspeople in England
Beninese expatriate sportspeople in Australia
Beninese expatriate sportspeople in Greece
Beninese expatriate sportspeople in Iran
Expatriate footballers in Greece
Expatriate soccer players in Australia